Jean Durand (1882–1946) was a French screenwriter and film director of the silent era. He was extremely prolific, working on well over two hundred films. He was married to the actress Berthe Dagmar.

Selected filmography
 Tarnished Reputations (1920, writer)
 Madame Sans-Gêne (1925, assistant director)
 Palaces (1927)
 An Ideal Woman (1929)
 Island of Love (1929)
 Distress (1929)

References

Bibliography
 Rège, Philippe. Encyclopedia of French Film Directors, Volume 1. Scarecrow Press, 2009.

External links

1882 births
1946 deaths
20th-century French screenwriters
Film directors from Paris